Route 235 or Highway 235 may refer to:

Canada
 Newfoundland and Labrador Route 235
 Prince Edward Island Route 235
 Quebec Route 235

Costa Rica
 National Route 235

Italy
 State road 235

Japan
 Japan National Route 235

United States
 Interstate 235
 Alabama State Route 235
 Arkansas Highway 235
 California State Route 235 (unbuilt)
 Florida State Road 235
 Georgia State Route 235 (former)
 Indiana State Road 235
 Kentucky Route 235
 Maine State Route 235
 Maryland Route 235
 Minnesota State Highway 235
 Montana Secondary Highway 235 (former)
 New Mexico State Road 235
 New York State Route 235
 Ohio State Route 235
 Oregon Route 235 (former)
 Pennsylvania Route 235
 South Dakota Highway 235
 Tennessee State Route 235
 Texas Farm to Market Road 235
 Utah State Route 235
 Vermont Route 235
 Virginia State Route 235
 Wyoming Highway 235